Chukwu is a surname of Nigerian Igbo origin and may refer to:
 Andy Chukwu (born 1959), Nigerian movie director
 Callistus Chukwu (born 1990), Nigerian professional footballer
 Chinedu Sunday Chukwu (born 1997), Nigerian professional footballer
 Chinonye Chukwu (born 1985), Nigerian-American film director
 Christian Chukwu (born 1951), Nigerian football former player and former national team coach
 Clement Chukwu (born 1973), Nigerian former athlete
 Daniel Chima Chukwu (born 1991), Nigerian professional footballer
 Hannah Chukwu (born 2003), Hungarian professional squash player
 John Chukwu (1947–1990), Nigerian comedian, actor and MC
 Lota Chukwu, Nigerian actress
 Morice Chukwu (born 2002), Nigerian professional footballer
 Onyebuchi Chukwu (born 1962), Nigerian politician
 Raphael Chukwu (born 1975), Nigerian international footballer
 Regina Chukwu, Nigerian actress, film producer and director
 Ude Oko Chukwu (born 1962), Nigerian accountant and politician

Igbo-language surnames
Nigerian names
Surnames of Nigerian origin